Indratherium is an extinct genus of giraffidae. It was first named by Pilgrim in 1910.

External links
 Indratherium at the Paleobiology Database

Prehistoric giraffes
Prehistoric even-toed ungulate genera